Merab Megreladze (26 January 1956 – 24 January 2012) was a Georgian football player.

In 1977 he joined FC Guria Lanchkhuti playing in the Soviet Second League. He scored 88 goals in 188 games. He was top scorer in 1978-1979 when they were promoted to the Soviet First League and was top scorer for the next two seasons.

He then joined Torpedo Kutaisi in 1982 and was top scorer for five seasons, including 29 goals in the 1989 Soviet First League.

He returned to Guria in 1987 and then again in 1991 playing in the recently formed Georgian Umaglesi Liga. In 1992 he moved to FC Samgurali Tskhaltubo where in his only season, he scored 41 goals in just 31 games, making him the top scorer in Europe for the season, although wasn't officially recognised as such. It remains a Georgian league record. He moved to FC Margveti Zestafoni where he was the league's top scorer again with 31 goals in 31 games. In total, he scored 104 goals in 140 matches in the Umaglesi Liga and 343 goals in 665 games in all competitions.

His son Giorgi, born in 1978, also became a footballer.

References

External links
 Playerhistory profile

1956 births
2012 deaths
Soviet footballers
Footballers from Georgia (country)
Association football forwards
Soviet Top League players
Erovnuli Liga players
FC Dinamo Tbilisi players
FC Sibir Novosibirsk players